Mahesana Junction railway station (also spelt Mehsana unofficially) is located in Mehsana district in the Indian state of Gujarat. It serves the city of Mehsana.

History
Rajputana State Railway extended the metre-gauge Delhi–Ajmer line to Ahmedabad in 1881. In 1880, the Government of Bombay addressed His Highness’ Government of Baroda State for the construction of feeder lines in Kadi after the completion of Dabhoi Railway. In Kadi, a network of railway line was spread out. The Government of Bombay and the government of Baroda State, sanctioned the Mehsana–Viramgam line in 1889. The Mehsana–Taranga Hill metre-gauge line was opened for traffic from 1887 to 1909.
The Khodiyar–Mahesana sector was converted to  broad gauge in 1995 and the Mahesana–Palanpur section was converted in 1997, which along with the conversion of the Ajmer–Palanpur section, completed the conversion of the entire Jaipur–Ahmedabad line. Viramgam–Mahesana section was re-opened in 2005, after gauge conversion to  broad gauge. Mahesana–Taranga Hill line is under gauge conversion to  broad gauge.

Infrastructure and Facilities

It has 6 platforms and 2 siding tracks. It is railway junction of four lines that are Ahmedabad–Delhi line, Mahesana–Taranga Hill line, Mahesana–Patan line, Mahesana–Viramgam line.

References

External links
 Trains at Mahesana

Railway stations in Mahesana district
Ahmedabad railway division
Railway junction stations in Gujarat
Railway stations in India opened in 1881
1881 establishments in India
Transport in Mehsana